The Voice is a 1992 French drama film directed by Pierre Granier-Deferre, starring Sami Frey and Nathalie Baye. Based on a short story by Pierre Drieu La Rochelle, it tells the story of a man who is transfixed when he hears the voice of a woman he once was in love with. It was shown in the Panorama section of the 42nd Berlin International Film Festival.

Plot
Arriving back in Rome after a business trip, Gilles contacts Lorraine and they make hasty love in the open among the ruins. Agreeing to meet again that evening at a rooftop restaurant, Gilles is hopelessly distracted by a voice he hears at another table. It is Laura, a married woman he had a passionate affair with, and he tells Lorraine the whole story, from first joyous encounter to her final suicide attempt. While Lorraine has no desire to hear all the details, she reluctantly lets Gilles get his memories out of his system. After the meal, though he is exhausted by the recalled emotion, she joins him in his bedroom.

Cast
 Sami Frey as Gilles
 Nathalie Baye as Lorraine
 Laura Morante as Laura
 Jean-Claude Dreyfus as Head waiter
 Georges Claisse as Michele

References

1992 films
Films based on short fiction
Films based on works by Pierre Drieu La Rochelle
Films directed by Pierre Granier-Deferre
Films scored by Philippe Sarde
Films set in Rome
French drama films
1990s French-language films
1990s French films